Carlos Taberner was the defending champion but chose not to defend his title.

Benjamin Bonzi won the title after defeating countryman Grégoire Barrère 6–2, 6–4 in the final.

Seeds

Draw

Finals

Top half

Bottom half

References

External links
Main draw
Qualifying draw

Open du Pays d'Aix - 1
2022 Singles